Bread is a 1924 American drama film directed by Victor Schertzinger. Based on the best-selling novel of the same name by Charles G. Norris, the film stars Mae Busch.

Cast

Preservation
With no prints of Bread located in any film archives, it is a lost film.

References

External links

Still at silenthollywood.com

1924 films
Metro-Goldwyn-Mayer films
1924 drama films
American black-and-white films
American silent feature films
Silent American drama films
Films directed by Victor Schertzinger
Lost American films
1924 lost films
Lost drama films
1920s American films